Saint Trésain (or Tressan, Tresanus; 6th century) was an Irish missionary in France.
His feast day is 7 February.

Saint Trésain is patron of Mareuil sur Marne (Mareuil-sur-Ay) and of the parish church of Avenay-Val-d'Or.

Monks of Ramsgate account

The monks of St Augustine's Abbey, Ramsgate wrote in their Book of Saints (1921),

Butler's account

The hagiographer Alban Butler (1710–1773) wrote in his Lives of the Fathers, Martyrs, and Other Principal Saints under February 7,

Majoret's Vie

Laurent Majoret published his Vie de S. Tresain in Toul in 1650, reissued in Rheims in 1700 and in 1743.
He wrote that Trésain was born in Ireland of honest and prosperous parents and decided to dedicate himself to God.
He had six brothers, the saints Gibrain, Tésan, Germain, Véran, Atran and Pétran, and three sisters, the saints Trantle, Pomprie and Possenne, all of whom accompanied him to France.
There he placed himself under Saint Remy, Archbishop of Reims, who directed them to stay at a place beside the River Marne.  
Wanting to become a priest, Trésain undertook the study of Latin and Christian works.
After completing his study he was ordained by Remy at Reims, despite opposition from the gentry of Ay.
He was assigned to the village of Mareuil sur Marne.
He performed various miracles during his ministry.
He died on 7 February and his body was taken to the abbey of Avenay.

Notes

Sources

 

 

6th-century Christian saints
Medieval Irish saints on the Continent
6th-century deaths